Nikolayevsky District is the name of several administrative and municipal districts in Russia. The districts' name generally comes from the first name Nikolay.
Nikolayevsky District, Khabarovsk Krai, an administrative and municipal district of Khabarovsk Krai
Nikolayevsky District, Ulyanovsk Oblast, an administrative and municipal district of Ulyanovsk Oblast
Nikolayevsky District, Volgograd Oblast, an administrative and municipal district of Volgograd Oblast

See also
Nikolayevsky (disambiguation)

References